Family Power is an Indian reality television family game show, which aired on Colors Kannada from 25 November 2017 to April 2018. It was hosted by Puneeth Rajkumar. The show's prize money was Rs.10 lakh. The funds raised in the final episode was used on Cochlear implant for children suffering from hearing loss.The show was produced by Pixel Pictures Private Limited.

References

External links
 Show on Voot

2017 Indian television series debuts
Kannada-language television shows
Colors Kannada original programming